WAY-214156 is a synthetic nonsteroidal estrogen that acts as a highly selective agonist of the ERβ. It is 100-fold selective for the ERβ over the ERα with an IC50 of 4.2 nM (compare to estradiol with IC50 values of ~3–4 nM for both the ERα and ERβ). The drug is less selective for the ERβ than is prinaberel (ERB-041, WAY-202041), another selective ERβ agonist, but is more potent in comparison. WAY-214156 may produce anti-inflammatory effects via the ERβ and has been proposed as a potential treatment for inflammatory conditions such as rheumatoid arthritis.

See also
 8β-VE2
 Diarylpropionitrile
 ERB-196
 FERb 033
 WAY-166818
 WAY-200070

References

Phenols
Nitriles
Selective ERβ agonists
Synthetic estrogens